HMS Resolution was a 70-gun third rate ship of the line of the Royal Navy, built at Woolwich Dockyard and launched on 15 March 1705.

Resolution was lost when she ran ashore in 1707.

Notes

References

Lavery, Brian (2003) The Ship of the Line - Volume 1: The development of the battlefleet 1650-1850. Conway Maritime Press. .

Ships of the line of the Royal Navy
1700s ships